The Spor Toto Cycling Team is a Turkish professional road bicycle racing team that was founded in 2020.

Team roster

Major wins
2020
 National Under-23 Time Trial Championships, Oğuzhan Tiryaki
2021
 Overall Tour of Mevlana, Anatoliy Budyak
Stage 3, Anatoliy Budyak

National champions
2020
 Turkey Under–23 Time Trial, Oğuzhan Tiryaki

References

External links

Cycling teams established in 2020
UCI Continental Teams (Europe)
Cycling teams based in Turkey